Alessandro Alberto De Souza Ferreira Berisso (born 23 March 1992) is a Peruvian sports shooter. He competed in the men's trap event at the 2020 Summer Olympics.

References

External links
 

1992 births
Living people
Peruvian male sport shooters
Olympic shooters of Peru
Shooters at the 2020 Summer Olympics
Pan American Games competitors for Peru
Shooters at the 2019 Pan American Games
Sportspeople from Lima
21st-century Peruvian people